Sukaa or suka is one of the denominations of the Nepalese rupee. One suka is equal to 25 paisa and four sukas make a rupee. Also, two sukas make a mohor.  Sukaas as well as  used to circulate extensively in Nepal but these days they are rarely seen in markets.

Notes

Suka, Nepalese
Currencies of Nepal